Thma Koul (lit. "Terminal Stone") is a district (srok) of Battambang Province, in north-western Cambodia.

Administration 
The district is subdivided into 10 communes (khum).

Communes and villages 
As of 2020.

References 

 
Districts of Battambang province